Henry Compton (1632 – 7 July 1713) was the Bishop of London from 1675 to 1713.

Early life
Compton was born the sixth and youngest son of the 2nd Earl of Northampton. He was educated at The Queen's College, Oxford, but left in 1654 without a degree, and then travelled in Europe. After the restoration of Charles II in 1660 he became a cornet in his brother Charles's troop of the Royal Regiment of Horse, but soon quit the army for the church. After a further period of study at Cambridge and again at Oxford, he graduated as a D.D. in 1669. He held various livings, including rector of Cottenham, and Witney.

Episcopal career
He was made Bishop of Oxford in 1674, and in the following year was translated to the see of London, and also appointed Dean of the Chapel Royal. He was also appointed a member of the Privy Council, and entrusted with the education of the two princesses, Mary and Anne. He showed a liberality most unusual at the time to Protestant dissenters, whom he wished to reunite with the established church. He held several conferences on the subject with the clergy of his diocese; and in the hope of influencing candid minds by means of the opinions of unbiased foreigners, he obtained letters treating of the question (since printed at the end of Edward Stillingfleet's Unreasonableness of Separation) from Le Moyne, professor of divinity at the University of Leiden, and the famous French Protestant divine, Jean Claude.

In 1676 he was instructed by Lord Danby to conduct an ecclesiastical census of the population, which became known as the Compton Census.

In contrast to his liberality about Protestant dissent, Compton was strongly opposed to Roman Catholicism. On the accession of James II in February 1685 he consequently lost his seat in the council and his position as Dean of the Chapel Royal; and for his firmness in refusing to suspend John Sharp, rector of St Giles's-in-the-Fields, whose anti-papal preaching had rendered him obnoxious to the king, he was himself suspended by James's Ecclesiastical Commission in mid-1686. The suspension was lifted in September 1688, two days before the Commission was abolished.

At the Glorious Revolution Compton embraced the cause of William III and Mary II, being one of the Immortal Seven who invited William to invade England. He performed the ceremony of their coronation as the Archbishop of Canterbury William Sancroft considered himself still bound by his oath of allegiance to James II. Among other appointments, Compton was chosen as one of the commissioners for revising the liturgy. During the reign of Anne he remained a member of the privy council, and was one of the commissioners appointed to arrange the terms of the union of England and Scotland; but, to his bitter disappointment, his claims to the primacy were twice passed over. He died at Fulham on 7 July 1713, and was buried at All Saints Church, Fulham.

Works

Compton was a successful botanist. He also published, besides several theological works, A Translation from the Italian of the Life of Donna Olympia Maladichini, who governed the Church during the time of Pope Innocent X, which was from the year 1644 to 1655 (1667), and A Translation from the French of the Jesuits' Intrigues (1669).

References

External links

1632 births
1713 deaths
Alumni of The Queen's College, Oxford
Alumni of the University of Cambridge
Deans of the Chapel Royal
Bishops of London
Bishops of Oxford
Chancellors of the College of William & Mary
Members of the Privy Council of England
Younger sons of earls
Henry
Royal Horse Guards officers
Burials at All Saints Church, Fulham
18th-century Church of England bishops
17th-century Church of England bishops
People of the Glorious Revolution